Scarus niger, common names the swarthy parrotfish, dusky parrotfish, and black parrotfish, is a species of parrotfish. It is in the phylum Chordata, class Actinopterygii, and family Scaridae. Like other members of its family, it has characteristic 10 dorsal soft rays, 9 dorsal spines, 9 anal soft rays, and 3 anal spines, It is found in Indo-West and Central Pacific, from the Red Sea, north to Japan, south to Australia and east to French Polynesia. The dusky parrotfish often lives in solitude, but males may also live in a small group of mating females. The dusky parrotfish is primarily herbivorous, and its main source of food is benthic algae. At maturity, the fish is approximately 230-240mm long and weighs around 240g.

Reproduction 
The dusky parrotfish is a protogynous hermaphrodite, as evidenced by instances where a dominant female in a group with only females turned into a male. The dusky parrotfish is oviparous, so when breeding, the male and female fishes form pairs and the female lays eggs that later hatch. It undergoes a reproductive cycle that can be defined by the size and appearance of its gonads; after 5 stages of maturity, the gonads of the fish weigh an average of 2.54 g. After breeding, the gonads regress in size till they weigh an average of 0.37 g, decreasing over a fifth in size when not breeding in comparison to the size of the gonads during breeding season. Dusky parrotfishes release one batch of eggs per breeding season.

Feeding Behavior 
The dusky parrotfish feeds primarily on algae found on hard substrate and dead coral. It has a relatively fast feeding rate of around 98.9 bites in 5 minutes in comparison to other parrotfish species; however, at the same time, it has a relatively small bite volume of 0.002 cm3. It contributes very little to bio-erosion in comparison to other parrotfish, averaging around 2.5 ± 0.9 cm3 per hour. It does not follow any set feeding pattern, but it tends to feed more in the morning and afternoon rather than at midday and sundown. The short term foraging range of the dusky parrotfish is 4.9 ± 3.6 m2 to 33.5 ± 5.9 m2. Denser coral patches that provide more cover for the fish leads to a decrease in the foraging range, as well as denser populations. In comparison to other species of parrotfishes, the dusky parrotfish tends to be less aggressive and will decrease its foraging range when it is in an environment with a high parrotfish density. Competition between parrotfishes negatively affects the parrotfish more than benefits gained from group foraging, such as reductions in predation risks. These changes in foraging range indicate that the dusky parrotfish is able to make small changes to its grazing behavior under short-term disturbances; however, it is unclear whether these compensatory mechanisms can withstand significant change in the fishes' environment.

Marine herbivores like the swarthy parrotfish rely on endosymbiotic microorganisms to digest carbohydrates. In aerobic conditions, bacteria ferments the carbohydrates and produces short-chain fatty acids or SCFAs. First studied in vertebrate herbivores, SCFAs also allow marine herbivores to further digest carbohydrates that were not broken down by digestive enzymes. This process may contribute as much as 30% of the basal metabolic energy needed for the organism. Acetate was the major SCFA found in the plasma of Swarthy parrotfish, ranging from .45 ± .11 mM to 3.80 ± 1.89 mM, suggesting the swarthy parrotfish fishes use microbial digestion.

Ecology 
The presence of the swarthy parrotfish in large and small reef communities contributes to diversity and therefore the resilience of the ecosystem. The reef ecosystem may be dramatically shifted in the absence of the swarthy parrotfish. After extreme climate events, like cyclones, subtle reef dynamics change such as grazing by herbivorous fish. In 2011-2012, after severe climate disturbances, grazing by herbivorous fish, including the swarthy parrotfish, decreased by over 90%. Although these changes were not visible, they make the reef ecosystem highly unstable, and many reefs may be on the verge of collapse. The reductions in grazing can cause algal turfs, which are non-palpable to the swarthy parrotfish.

Distribution 
The dusky parrotfish are widely distributed, but mainly scattered around the Indo-Pacific region. Dusky parrotfishes inhabit areas of the reef that are coral-rich such as the reef flat and reef slope. The swarthy parrotfish is not heavily fished and therefore their population dynamics are more likely determined by habitat and recruitment

References

External links
 

niger
Fish described in 1775
Fish of the Atlantic Ocean
Taxa named by Peter Forsskål